Úrvalsdeild karla is a name given to top-tier men's competitions in Iceland and may refer to:
 Úrvalsdeild karla (basketball), the top tier men's basketball league in Iceland
 Úrvalsdeild karla (football), the top tier men's football league in Iceland
 Úrvalsdeild karla (handball), the top tier men's handball league in Iceland

See also
 Úrvalsdeild kvenna (disambiguation)